Annessa Hartman is an American politician and activist serving as a member of the Oregon House of Representatives for the 40th district. Elected in November 2022, she assumed office on January 9, 2023.

Education 
Hartman earned an associate of arts degree in hotel and restaurant management from the Le Cordon Bleu College of Culinary Arts in Pasadena, California.

Career 
From 2008 to 2016, Hartman worked in catering in Los Angeles and Concord, California. She moved to Portland, Oregon, to work as an event planner at Portland Center Stage. Hartman worked as the catering director at Eurest USA and as a sales manager at Marriott from 2018 to 2020. From 2020 to 2022, Hartman worked as the marketplace and retail coordinator for the Native American Youth and Family Center. She was elected to the Gladstone City Council in 2020 and the Oregon House of Representatives in November 2022. Hartman is also a chapter director at Unite Oregon.

Electoral history

2022

2020

References 

Living people
21st-century Native American politicians
Democratic Party members of the Oregon House of Representatives
Women state legislators in Oregon
People from Clackamas County, Oregon
Alumni of Le Cordon Bleu
21st-century American politicians
21st-century American women politicians
Oregon city council members
Women city councillors in Oregon
Native American women in politics
21st-century Native American women
Year of birth missing (living people)